Anoma Janadari (also spelled Anoma Janadare) is an actress in Sri Lankan cinema, stage drama and television. She has acted in critically acclaimed roles in the films Thani Thatuwen Piyabanna and Davena Wihagun.

Career
She started acting career with the stage drama Hitler in 1985 and Percy Perera's drama, Nara Lovin Ekek Aapi. Then she continued to act in many plays including Hena, Maghatha, Veniceye Welenda, Polina, Gandhi, Makarakshya, Eedipas, Samawenna Weradeemak and Sinhabhau Lawa Gassawa. Her maiden television acting came through 1990 serial Prabathaya. Some of her popular television serials are Dunhinda Addara and Diyaketa Pahana. He maiden cinematic experience came through 1992 film Channa Kinnariya.

She played leading roles in Burning Birds, Thani Thatuwen Piyabanna (Flying with One Wing) and This Is My Moon. In 2008, she acted in the stage play Suppadevi.* Sadgunakaraya 

On 3 May 2011, she launched her auto biography Punarukthi - Mage Kathawa in a ceremony at Sri Lanka Television Training Institute at 4.00 pm. At the same occasion, she launched her official website as well.

Awards and accolades
She won the best actress award at Singapore International Film Festival 2003 for Flying with One Wing, and Asian World Film Festival 2017 in Los Angeles, USA for a role of Kusum in the film Burning Birds. She also won the best actress award for the same movie at the SAARC film festival 2019, and the Seventh Derana Lux Film Awards 2019. In 2003, she was the best actress in the 16th Singapore International Film Festival.

Singapore International Film Festival

|-
|| 2003 ||| Thani Thatuwen Piyabanna || Best Actress ||

Asian World Film Festival

|-
|| 2017 ||| Davena Wihagun || Best Actress ||

Derana Film Awards

|-
|| 2018 ||| Davena Wihagun || Best Actress ||

Presidential Film Awards

|-
|| 2018 ||| Davena Wihagun || Best Actress || 
|-
|| 2019 ||| Davena Wihagun || Vishwakeerthi Award ||

SAARC Film Festival

|-
|| 2019 ||| Davena Wihagun || Best Actress ||

SIGNIS Awards

|-
|| 2018 ||| Davena Wihagun || Best Actress ||

Filmography

References

External links
 Gossip Chat with Anoma Janadari
 Quick and fast Katakatha In daily: Anoma janadari
 නිරුවත සමඟ හොඳ ගණුදෙනුව
 Now that there’s freedom of expression : Artistes take up the cudgel
 Anoma’s book reborn in English
 අනෝමා දෙබරයට ගල් ගසයි

21st-century Sri Lankan actresses
Year of birth missing (living people)
Living people
Sri Lankan film actresses